Tubism is a term coined by the art critic Louis Vauxcelles in 1911 to describe the style of French artist Fernand Léger.  Meant as derision, the term was inspired by  Léger's idiosyncratic version of Cubism, in which he emphasized cylindrical shapes.  The style was developed by Léger in his paintings of 1909–1919, such as Nudes in the Forest (1909–10) and Soldiers Playing Cards (1917).

References

Bibliography
Néret, Gilles (1993). F. Léger. New York: BDD Illustrated Books. 
Buck, Robert T., et al. (1982). Fernand Léger. New York: Abbeville. 

Cubism